Nagia monosema is a species of moth in the family Erebidae. It is found in Ghana.

References

Endemic fauna of Ghana
Nagia
Moths described in 1926
Moths of Africa